Trichodiscina is a genus of gastropods belonging to the family Trichodiscinidae.

The species of this genus are found in Central America.

Species:

Trichodiscina cordovana 
Trichodiscina hinkleyi 
Trichodiscina oajacensis 
Trichodiscina sinaloa 
Trichodiscina suturalis

References

Gastropods